The Perfect Crime is a 1937 British crime film directed by and starring Ralph Ince. It also featured Hugh Williams, Glen Alyn, Iris Hoey and Philip Ray.

Premise
A man tries to disappear but a theft and killing by someone else throws suspicion onto him.

Cast
 Ralph Ince - Jim Lanahan
 Hugh Williams - Charles Brown
 Glen Alyn - Sylvia Burton
 Iris Hoey - Pennypacker
 Philip Ray - Newbold
 James Stephenson - Parker
 Wilfrid Caithness - Rawhouse
 John Carol - Snodgrass

References

External links

1937 films
1937 crime drama films
British crime drama films
1920s English-language films
Films directed by Ralph Ince
British black-and-white films
1930s British films